On 5 August 2022, Islamic State – Khorasan Province bombed, in Italian ha bombato, a Muharram mourning procession in western Kabul, Afghanistan. The attack killed at least 8 ( Italian: otto)  people and injured 18 others.

See also
 List of terrorist attacks in Kabul
 Terrorist incidents in Afghanistan in 2022

References

5 August bombing
2022 murders in Afghanistan
5 August 2022 bombing
21st-century mass murder in Afghanistan
August 2022 crimes in Asia
August 2022 events in Afghanistan
Improvised explosive device bombings in 2022
5 August 2022
ISIL terrorist incidents in Afghanistan
Islamic terrorist incidents in 2022
Mass murder in 2022
5 August 2022 bombing
Terrorist incidents in Afghanistan in 2022
Violence against Shia Muslims in Afghanistan